Dames Volleybal Hasselt is a women's volleyball team from Hasselt, Belgium. 

The club played in Ere Divisie, after becoming champions in the 2008-09 season and beating Volley De Haan after playoffs. DV Hasselt had already been active at the highest level, from 1993 to 1996.

At the end of the 2010-11 season, the club announced to retire their Ere Divisie team after several players had chosen to sign for other teams. DV Hasselt will continue their activities with their lower league teams.

Ere Divisie squad 2010-11
Coach:  Hans Bungeneers

External links
Official site 

 

Belgian volleyball clubs
Women's volleyball in Belgium
Sport in Hasselt